Wonik Yi is a martial artist and the founder of the World Tukong Moosul Teuk Gong Moo Sool Federation.

Biography
In 1964, at the age of five, Wonik Yi entered the Dae Yeon Sa Temple in Korea and lived there until the age of nineteen. Dae Yeon Sa is a Buddhist temple that teaches martial arts in a tradition that dates back 800 years. He trained in Moosul (traditional martial arts) under the guidance of his teacher, Eun Kwang Bup Sa, until he joined the South Korean Special Forces. Yi also trained in Shaolin Kung Fu style martial arts. Due to this, there are many similarities between Tukong Moosul and Shaolin style martial arts.

While he was in the army Yi was asked to devise a more modern, powerful, and effective fighting martial arts for the South Korea Special Forces. The military version of Tukong Martial Arts was born in February 1978. In 1980, Korean Military 26th division became Tukong Division and most other divisions started training men using Yi's system. There are now several hundred thousand South Korean military and reserve soldiers training each year in the military version of Tukong Martial Arts.

Wonik Yi moved to the United States in 1982 and has been teaching Tukong Moosul in Austin, Texas since then.  The Tukong Moosul taught by Yi at his facility in Austin is taught in a similar style to the forms he learned in South Korea.

Yi's Tukong Moosul is the combination of the traditional ancient temple style and an innovative modern style based on scientific research and theories.

Filmography
Grand Master Yi has participated in several films, offering his expertise in the martial arts.

Notes

References

External links
 World Tukong Moosul Federation

Living people
South Korean male martial artists
1959 births
South Korean emigrants to the United States
Sportspeople from Austin, Texas